The 2013 IIHF World Championship Division I was a pair of international Ice hockey tournaments run by the International Ice Hockey Federation. Group A contested in Budapest, Hungary and Group B contested in Donetsk, Ukraine, both running from 14 April to 20 April 2013. Divisions I A and I B represent the second and the third tier of the Ice Hockey World Championships.

For the third consecutive year the two nations that had been demoted from the top level, were sent right back.  In Group A Kazakhstan and Italy narrowly held off Hungary to achieve promotion, who lost for the first time in their history to South Korea.  The Koreans also defeated Great Britain on the final day, relegating the British, and achieving a placement of 21st overall, their best ever finish.

In Group B, Ukraine returned to Group A, Estonia returned to Division II, and the other four nations repeated their placements from 2012. The final day was dramatic though, as it featured head-to-head match-ups to determine promotion and relegation.  Both Poland and Ukraine were undefeated until they met in the final game of the tournament, Ukraine came out ahead four to three. The game between the two winless Baltic nations was not as dramatic, as Lithuania scored twelve to stay in Division I.

Division I A

Participants

Officials

Referees
  Thomas Berneker
  Maxim Sidorenko
  Pascal St-Jacques
  Jimmy Bergamelli
  Pawel Meszynski
  Alexander Sergeev
  Daniel Konc

Linesmen
  Justin Hull
  Jiří Gebauer
  Attila Nagy
  Marton Németh
  Alexander Waldejer
  Joris Müller
  David Brown

Final standings

Results
All times are local (CEST – UTC+2).

Statistics

Top 10 scorers

IIHF.com

Goaltending leaders
(minimum 40% team's total ice time)

IIHF.com

Tournament awards
Best players selected by the directorate:
Best Goalkeeper:  Adam Dennis
Best Defenseman:  Aaron Keller
Best Forward:  Patrick Iannone
IIHF.com

Division I B

Participants

Officials

Referees
  Michael Hicks
  Andris Ansons
  Peter Lokšík
  Maksym Urda

Linesmen
  Frederic Monnaie
  Rene Jensen
  Ulrich Pardatscher
  Martin Korba
  Damir Rakovič
  Anton Hladchenko
  Artem Korepanov

Final standings

Results
All times are local (EEST – UTC+3).

Statistics

Top 10 scorers

IIHF.com

Goaltending leaders
(minimum 40% team's total ice time)

 IIHF.com

Tournament awards
Best players selected by the directorate:
Best Goalkeeper:  Martijn Oosterwijk
Best Defenseman:  Paweł Dronia
Best Forward:  Oleh Tymchenko
 IIHF.com

References

External links
IIHF.com

IIHF World Championship Division I
2
IIHF
IIHF
2013 IIHF World Championship Division I
2013 IIHF World Championship Division I